The 2017–18 UC Riverside Highlanders men's basketball team represented the University of California, Riverside during the 2017–18 NCAA Division I men's basketball season. The Highlanders, led by interim head coach Justin Bell, played their home games at the Student Recreation Center Arena in Riverside, California, as members of the Big West Conference. They finished the season 9–22, 4–12 in Big West play to finish in a tie for seventh place. As the No. 8 seed in the Big West tournament, they lost in the quarterfinals to UC Davis.

On January 1, 2018, three days before conference play was to start, head coach Dennis Cutts, who was in his fifth season at UC Riverside, was fired after posting a 5–9 record to start the season.  Associate head coach Justin Bell was named interim head coach. On March 14, the school hired TCU assistant coach David Patrick as head coach.

Previous season
The Highlanders finished the 2016–17 season 7–21, 5–11 in Big West play to finish in eighth place. As the No. 8 seed in the Big West tournament, they were defeated by UC Irvine in the quarterfinals.

Offseason

Departures

Incoming transfers

2017 incoming recruits

Roster

Schedule and results

|-
!colspan=9 style=| Quebec Tour

|-
!colspan=9 style=| Exhibition

|-
!colspan=9 style=| Non-conference regular season

|-
!colspan=9 style=| Big West regular season

|-
!colspan=9 style=| Big West tournament

Source:

References

UC Riverside Highlanders men's basketball seasons
UC Riverside
UC Riverside Highlanders men's basketball
UC Riverside Highlanders men's basketball